Melvin G. Goldstein (October 23, 1945 – January 18, 2012), known on air as Dr. Mel, was an on-air television meteorologist and the chief meteorologist for WTNH in New Haven, Connecticut, from 1986 to 2011. He also served as the meteorologist for the radio station WLAD in Danbury, Connecticut from the mid-1970s to 2012 and for WQUN in Hamden, Connecticut.

Early life and education
Goldstein was born in Swampscott, Massachusetts, in 1945, where, as Goldstein himself put it, "the conversation was always about the weather."  He earned a degree in meteorology from Penn State in 1967, followed by a doctorate from New York University.

Career
In 1972, Goldstein took up a teaching job at Western Connecticut State University. He established Connecticut's only meteorology bachelor's degree, and began to run WestConn's weather center, which supplied forecasting information to 20 local radio and television stations. Goldstein joined WTNH as a meteorologist in 1986, becoming a local celebrity and eventually WTNH's chief meteorologist. In 1999, he authored the Complete Idiot's Guide to Weather. He held the honorary title of Director Emeritus at WestConn's Weather Center.

Personal life
In 1996 Goldstein was diagnosed with multiple myeloma, which his doctors predicted would claim his life within three years. Hoping to beat the diagnosis, Goldstein underwent treatment at Yale-New Haven Hospital, far outliving his initial prognosis. He returned to work at WTNH, though on a limited on-air schedule.

Retirement
On August 23, 2011, WTNH announced Goldstein's retirement after 25 years of service. In celebration of his service, the station produced a prime-time tribute to Goldstein.

Death
On January 18, 2012, Mel Goldstein died of complications and declining health due to multiple myeloma at the age of 66. He is survived by his wife Arlene and two daughters Laura and Melodie.

On August 20, 2012 Goldstein's wife Arlene, Mayor Joseph Maturo, Jr. and the town of East Haven hosted brief a ceremony along with other officials, family, and friends to unveil a memorial park bench in Mel's honor which was placed at the East Haven town beach. The bench was donated by Goldstein's wife Arlene.

References

External links
Short bio
Dr. Mel Myeloma site
Storm Team 8 Weather

1945 births
2012 deaths
American television personalities
American meteorologists
Penn State College of Earth and Mineral Sciences alumni
Deaths from cancer in Connecticut
Deaths from multiple myeloma
People from Swampscott, Massachusetts
Place of death missing